The Šaľa Stadion is a multi-purpose stadium in Šaľa, Slovakia. Currently, it is mostly used for football matches and is the home ground of FK Slovan Duslo Šaľa.  The stadium holds 1,126 people.

Football venues in Slovakia
Multi-purpose stadiums in Slovakia
Buildings and structures in Nitra Region
Sport in Nitra Region